Bourbon-Lancy is a commune in the Saône-et-Loire department in the region of Bourgogne-Franche-Comté in eastern France.

It is a rural town on the river Loire with a walled medieval area on the dominant hill. It has an authentic medieval belfry, wooden frame houses and fortifications which date from 1495.

Geography
The commune is located primarily on the right bank of the Loire, the river running through the far west corner of its territory.

History
Situated in Burgundy on the road from Paris to Lyon, and on the Loire River, the city's history spans well over 2000 years. Bourbon-Lancy is a spa town with thermal springs which have been known since Roman times, when it was known as Aquae Bormonis and enjoyed great prosperity. In the Middle Ages, Bourbon-Lancy was an important stronghold and a fief of the Bourbon family, and its suffix is derived from the name of a member of the family.

Cardinal Richelieu, Madame de Sévigné, James II of England, Catherine de Medici and other celebrated people visited the thermal springs in the 17th and 18th centuries.

During the 19th and early 20th centuries, it was a center for the manufacture of agricultural machinery.

Toponymy
The name Bourbon is derived from the name of the Gallic and Italic god Borvo and signifies bubbling or boiling, referring to the thermal hot springs in the town.

Industry
Fiat Powertrain Technologies, a Fiat plant
 H. F. Guy, cabinet maker for the French loudspeaker manufacturer Focal S.A., on the site of the former factory used by lingerie-maker Dim (now DBApparel) between 1965 and 2001.

Sights
Bourbon-Lancy has some of the most well-preserved medieval structures in Saône-et-Loire:
 Musée Saint Nazaire – housed in the 11th century Saint Nazaire Church - artifacts from ancient & modern Bourbon-Lancy
 Medieval center – shops, restaurants and an inn
 Thermal spas

The church of the Sacred Heart is an impressive example of nineteenth-century architecture.

The museums and casino also deserve a visit:
 Musée du Breuil
 Musée de la Machine Agricole Puzenat et des outils du bois
 Le Casino De Bourbon-Lancy

Gallery

See also
Communes of the Saône-et-Loire department

References

External links

 Official site of Bourbon-Lancy in French
 Shops and administrations of Bourbon-Lancy in French

Communes of Saône-et-Loire
Spa towns in France
Burgundy